is a professional Japanese baseball player. He plays pitcher for the Yokohama DeNA BayStars.

External links

 NPB.com

1989 births
Living people
Nippon Professional Baseball pitchers
Yokohama DeNA BayStars players
Japanese expatriate baseball players in Australia
Canberra Cavalry players